Orthogonius equimarginalis is a species of ground beetle in the subfamily Orthogoniinae. It was described by Tian & Deuve in 2006.

They live and breed in the soil it is suspected that they feed on decaying material and other insects. They have wings but are unable to fly.  They have a small head with antennae and big eyes on the sides, the thorax, and the abdomen.

References

equimarginalis
Beetles described in 2006